Kumao Imoto (井本熊男; 1903 in Yamaguchi Prefecture – 2000) was a Japanese military officer and a Lieutenant General of the Japan Ground Self-Defense Force.

Life
Imoto logged fatal experiments with cyanide gas as a weapon in 1942. He delivered the evacuation orders to the Japanese Seventeenth Army in Guadalcanal in the Pacific theatre of the Second World War (Operation Ke). The withdrawal was largely successful.

Imoto was the senior surviving staff officer in Hiroshima after the dropping of the atom bomb, and acted as chief of staff to Field Marshal Shunroku Hata during the immediate aftermath, though wounded.

After World War II, Imoto joined a group headed by Takushiro Hattori that aspired to become the new general staff of the fledging Japan Self-Defense Force. Imoto later reached the rank of Lieutenant General in the Ground Self-Defense Force.

Imoto's book The Great East Asian War, written as an Operations Diary (Dai Toa Senso Sakusen Nisshi) was published in 1979.

References
  Saaler, Sven & Schwentker, Wolfgang (ed.): The Power of Memory in Modern Japan, Global Oriental, 2008

Footnotes

Japan Ground Self-Defense Force generals
Imperial Japanese Army personnel of World War II
Imperial Japanese Army officers
1903 births
2000 deaths